Calibanus is a genus of two species of flowering plants, both evergreen succulents from dry areas of northeastern Mexico. The APG III classification system places it in the family Asparagaceae, subfamily Nolinoideae (formerly the family Ruscaceae.) It was formerly included in the Agavaceae (now Agavoideae) but is now separated from them, for it is polycarpic and dioecious. Its name refers to the monster Caliban, an antagonist in Shakespeare's The Tempest.

Calibanus is dioecious. It is extremely drought-tolerant, with a slow-growing habit. It has tuberous roots called caudices. The caudex can grow to 1m in diameter, with clumps of green-blue, coarse, grasslike, wiry leaves 50 cm long rising from the center and arching down with age. Clusters of tiny, creamy-white flowers, sometimes tinged with pink or purple, are rigid, about 10–20 cm long. Female plants bear globose, ovoid, 3-angled berries with ellipsoid seeds.

Species

 Calibanus glassianus  L.Hern. & Zamudio - Guanajuato
 Calibanus hookeri (Lem.) Trel. - San Luis Potosí, Hidalgo

References

Bihrmann's Cauduciforms, Calibanus hookeri
Cactus Art Nursery, Calibanus hookeri

Asparagaceae genera
Nolinoideae
Dioecious plants